"Syntrophothermus lipocalidus" is a bacterium, the type species and only currently described species in its genus. It is thermophilic, syntrophic, fatty-acid-oxidizing and anaerobic, and utilises isobutyrate. TGB-C1T is its type strain. Its genome has been fully sequenced.

References

Further reading
Staley, James T., et al. "Bergey's manual of systematic bacteriology, vol. 3. "Williams and Wilkins, Baltimore, MD (2012).

External links 
LPSN

Type strain of Syntrophothermus lipocalidus at BacDive -  the Bacterial Diversity Metadatabase

Eubacteriales
Bacteria described in 2000